Adolescence is a four track EP by British punk rock band Gnarwolves. It was released on 13 November 2015 through Big Scary Monsters in the United Kingdom on 300 on Green & Orange vinyl and 200 on Limited Edition Screenprinted B-Side.

Track listing

Personnel
Gnarwolves
Thom Weeks - Vocals/Guitar
Charlie Piper - Vocals/Bass
Max Weeks - Drums

References

2015 EPs
Big Scary Monsters Recording Company EPs
Gnarwolves albums